Cruz Pérez Cuéllar (born 16 January 1969) is a Mexican politician affiliated with the National Regeneration Movement (Morena) and a senator from Chihuahua to the LXIV Legislature of the Mexican Congress.

Life

Early political career
Pérez Cuéllar was born in Chihuahua, Mexico, on 16 January 1969. In 1988, Pérez Cuéllar joined the National Action Party (PAN), while he was pursuing a law degree from the Universidad Autónoma de Ciudad Juárez (UACJ) and owning a jewelry store known as La Colonial. He was involved with UACJ student organizations and the PAN. In 1991, he served as the coordinator for the PAN federal deputy campaign in Chihuahua's fourth district.

Three years later, Pérez Cuéllar was elected to the LVI Legislature of the Mexican Congress, becoming a federal deputy for the first time. He sat on seven commissions, including Youth Matters, Border Matters, and a special commission set up to investigate the assassination of José Francisco Ruiz Massieu. Additionally, during his term, Pérez Cuéllar became part of the municipal committee for the PAN in Ciudad Juárez and later as the secretary of organization for the PAN in the state of Chihuahua. Between 1997 and 1998, he was the state party's secretary general, second in ranking in the party's leadership.

In 1998, Pérez Cuéllar was elected to the Chihuahua state legislature, serving a three-year term and heading up the PAN caucus in the legislature. In 2000, during his term as legislator, he was elected the head of the PAN in Chihuahua, resigning in 2003 in advance of his 2004 campaign bid for mayor of Ciudad Juárez.

Pérez Cuéllar returned to the Chamber of Deputies from 2006 to 2009 in the LX Legislature, where he represented Chihuahua's third district and sat on four commissions. In 2008, he returned to the leadership of the state party organization of the PAN. In 2012, he sought but did not obtain the PAN nomination for a Senate candidacy; the three contenders all contested the internal election, and the national party approved Corral's candidacy, sanctioning Pérez Cuéllar in the process.

Break with the PAN and party switch
In March 2015, Pérez Cuéllar left the PAN after having accused then-senator Javier Corral Jurado of "doing the state government's dirty work" and of being linked to organized crime groups; he also made a legal demand against Corral and his two brothers, stating that they had committed crimes.

Pérez Cuéllar initially affiliated with Movimiento Ciudadano (MC) and ran as MC's gubernatorial candidate in 2016, running on a platform including participatory budgeting, a referendum to remove the governor midway through the term, and the creation of a network of day care facilities. It was later revealed that the gubernatorial campaign was paid for by outgoing governor César Duarte, to the tune of MXN$15 million, in 2017, during the trial of one of Duarte's associates, in a failed attempt to ensure that the PAN did not win the election; the money was obtained in fake contracts with a consulting firm.

Switch to Morena and Senate candidacy
In 2017, Pérez Cuéllar switched parties again and stated that he wanted to run in 2018 on a National Regeneration Movement (Morena) platform, noting the party was well set up for the next elections. In 2018, Pérez Cuéllar ran alongside Bertha Alicia Caraveo Camarena on the Juntos Haremos Historia ticket for election to the Senate from Chihuahua. The ticket earned a plurality of the votes on election day, sending both candidates to the Senate.

References

1969 births
Living people
Politicians from Chihuahua (state)
Members of the Chamber of Deputies (Mexico) for Chihuahua (state)
Morena (political party) politicians
20th-century Mexican politicians
21st-century Mexican politicians
Members of the Congress of Chihuahua
Universidad Autónoma de Ciudad Juárez alumni
Members of the Senate of the Republic (Mexico) for Chihuahua (state)
Deputies of the LX Legislature of Mexico